Banco is the fourth studio album by Italian progressive rock band Banco del Mutuo Soccorso (at that time known simply as Banco). The album was originally released in 1975 on the Manticore Records label launched by Emerson, Lake & Palmer with whom the band shared a firm stylistic similarity.

Background
Around 1975 the band attempted to make inroads outside their native Italy and released this English sung album on Emerson, Lake & Palmer's Manticore Records label. The album was largely a compilation, consisting of re-recordings of songs from their first three albums, with the exception of one track. The material from the second of the band's albums, Darwin! (1972) was completely omitted, however, while the only original track, with Italian lyrics, was "L'albero del pane." All the songs were re-recorded specially, with new arrangements, with the exception of the concluding piece "Traccia II", which was identical to the original recording.

The songs were translated into English by the American musician Marva Jan Marro. To promote the album, the band toured the US and UK with limited success.

CD re-release
In 2010 a new, re-mastered, edition of the album marked its British debut on CD and continued a comprehensive series of releases of the Manticore catalogue. The music was remastered by Ben Wiseman at The Audio Archiving Company.

Track listing

Personnel

Musicians
Pier Luigi Calderoni - drums and percussion 
Vittorio Nocenzi - organ, synthesizers, electronic strings
Renato D'Angelo - bass guitar, acoustic guitar 
Rodolfo Maltese - electric guitar, acoustic guitar, trumpet, backing vocals
Gianni Nocenzi - grand piano, clarinet and synthesizer
Francesco Di Giacomo - lead vocals

Technical
Engineers: Martin Rushent and Andy Hendricksen

Total time: approx. 47 minutes 51 seconds. Mixed at Advision and Air Studios, London.

References

1975 albums
Banco del Mutuo Soccorso albums
Manticore Records albums